Palmer is an unincorporated community in the town of Rush River, St. Croix County, Wisconsin, United States. The community was named for local land owner William Palmer, who moved to the area from New York in the 1860s. The Palmer post office opened in December of 1893 with William McConnell as the first postmaster.

Notes

Unincorporated communities in St. Croix County, Wisconsin
Unincorporated communities in Wisconsin